The Harmacloninae are a subfamily of moth of the family Tineidae.

Genera
 Harmaclona
 Micrerethista

References

 , 1998: A world classification of the Harmacloninae, a new subfamily of Tineidae (Lepidoptera: Tineoidea). Smithsonian Contributions to Zoology 597: 1-81. Full article: 
 , 2013: Study of the Subfamily Harmacloninae (Lepidoptera: Tineidae) in China. Acta zootaxonomica Sinica 38 (3)